Jessie Keane is a British author who lives in Hampshire. Her fascination with London and the underworld led her to write Dirty Game, followed by best sellers Black Widow, Scarlet Women, Jail Bird, The Make, Playing Dead and Nameless.

Earlier years
Jessie Keane was born in Hampshire, United Kingdom to Protestant parents. The Keane family were very wealthy due to the family business, however, when Jessie was fourteen, the family firm went bankrupt and she was left struggling financially in dead end jobs. She fled to London to escape a troubled family life, and fell in love with the city and the shady characters she met around the East End and Soho.

After marriage and divorce, she went on to write the acclaimed novel Dirty Game, starring Annie Bailey (later to become Annie Carter). She began writing at an early age, scripting puppet shows in primary school and winning literary prizes at the age of eight. That love of writing, that compulsion to write, never left her. So finally, determined to succeed in that field, she sold her wedding dress and bought a second-hand computer with the proceeds.

Flat broke, she penned chick lit novels without success. Then she wrote Dirty Game wearing a coat at the computer because she couldn't afford to have central heating installed. Her new partner told her to 'get a proper job' but she had a feeling this book was different. She sent it out to six agents, two came back straight away and one of them said she had someone who might be interested. Days later, Jessie was offered a 3-book deal for a six figure sum, and her writing career took off.

Career
Her first novel, Dirty Game was published in February 2008 and shot straight to the top of the Heatseekers chart, after Jessie phoned a highly popular publisher who commented that Keane's book was "highly gripping".

After the success of Jessie's first book, which featured fictional character Annie Bailey, Keane went on to write a collection of books featuring Bailey. Those books included Dirty Game, Scarlett Woman, Black Widow and Playing Dead. In 2008, when her first book was first published, Keane won five National Book Awards.  Keane's books have been described as "Utterly compelling" by television presenter Lorraine Kelly and also television presenter Philip Schofield commented that he "couldn't put the book down". "A QUEEN OF CRIME IS BORN," said a major literary critic.

Her novel, Nameless, was a move away from Annie Bailey, and features the headstrong character, Ruby Darke which her fans raved about. Ruby's search for her lost nameless son tugged at everyone's heartstrings and Jessie is currently in talks with a major film company to bring Nameless to the screen..

Keane released Ruthless in July 2013; it is the fifth book in the much acclaimed Annie Bailey/Carter series. Fans are always gasping to get their hands on the next Annie Carter book. Then came Lawless which followed Ruby Darke's progress again, then a stand-alone Dangerous' and Stay Dead, the sixth of the Annie Bailey/Carter books, released to great critical acclaim. And Annie's daughter Layla is going to carry on the family tradition of getting into terrible  scrapes in her lovelife and in gangland London.Fearless'' which tapped into Jessie's own Romany background, about a bare-knuckle gypsy boxer called Josh Flynn, followed, then came The Edge - Ruby Darke again - and The Knock, and The Manor is to follow 31st December 2020 and is available for pre-order from Amazon or on Jessie's website www.jessie-keane.co.uk right now.

Personal life
Jessie Keane lives in London and Hampshire.

Books
 Dirty Game (2008)
 The Make (2010)
 Black Widow (2009)
 Jail Bird (2009)
 Scarlett Women (2010)
 Playing Dead (2011)
 Nameless (2012)
 Ruthless (2013)
 Lawless (2014)
 Dangerous (2015)
 Stay Dead (2016)
 FEARLESS
 The Edge
 The Knock
 Coming 31st December 2020 - The Manor!

References
 
 Jessie Keane information from Killer Reads
 Publisher's author page

Living people
English crime writers
Year of birth missing (living people)